The 1898–99 Scottish Cup was the 26th season of Scotland's most prestigious football knockout competition. The cup was won by Celtic when they beat holders Rangers 2–0 in the final at the second Hampden Park to claim victory in the competition for the second time.

Calendar

First round

First round replay

Second round

Second round replay

Second round second replay

Quarter-final

Game Abandoned

Quarter-final replay

Semi-finals

Final

Teams

See also
1898–99 in Scottish football

References

RSSF Scottish Cup 98-99

1899-1900
Cup
Cup